The Richard Wagner Conservatory of Music in Vienna first began as a music school in 2009. Following extensive preparation the music school was then expanded to include a university level conservatory. As of 1 September 2013 the conservatory has been officially recognized by the Federal Ministry of Education, Arts and Culture. It is based at two separate locations in the 12th district of Vienna.

The curriculum of each respective field of study at Richard Wagner Conservatory is structured according to semesters, equal to the structure of academic studies as implemented at Austrian universities. The fields of study include: various instruments and voice; music education in instruments and voice, all of which lead to an internationally recognized diploma.

There is a music school connected to the conservatory where students can practice implementing their teaching skills.

There are students from various different countries, studying the piano, organ, voice, violin, cello, viola, contrabass, transverse flute, clarinet, saxophone, bassoon, horn, trumpet, tuba, guitar, and accordion. Lessons are held in German. Students must pass an entrance examination to be accepted to the conservatory. Students must be at least 16 years of age, there is no maximum age limit.

The principal of the conservatory is Mirza Kapetanovic. The body of academic staff consists of approx. 30 professors and instructors, all of which either teach at other universities, or are members of renowned opera houses, orchestras and ensembles.

Research done by the Austrian Magazine Dossier showed dubious doings concerning the conservatory. Teachers who were mentioned on the home page denied working there. The location turned out to be in an office block. International partners denied cooperations.

References

External links
 http://www.richard-wagner-konservatorium.at/

Music in Vienna
Richard Wagner